Mireșu Mare is a commune in Maramureș County, northwestern Romania. It is located near Ulmeni, on the right, eastern bank of the river Someș. The commune is composed of seven villages: Dăneștii Chioarului (Dánfalva), Iadăra (Jeder), Lucăcești (Szamoslukácsi), Mireșu Mare, Remeți pe Someș (Gyökeres), Stejera (Jávorfalu), and Tulghieș (Szamostölgyes).

References

Communes in Maramureș County